LNK (Laisvas ir nepriklausomas kanalas) is a commercial television channel operating in Lithuania and owned by MG Baltic Media. It was a free-to-air TV channel targeted towards a Lithuanian audience. It mainly broadcasts local entertainment, dubbed movies, lifestyle shows and news.

Over 1 million people watch LNK everyday.

History 
LNK was launched on 5 May 1995 and mainly retransmitted Russian programs from ORT (Now Channel One Russia). In 1996, they were replaced by original content. In 1996, LNK opened its headquarters in Vilnius. In 2003, the channel was bought by MG BALTIC GROUP. In 2012, LNK switched to Digital television. LNK shows mostly Lithuanian shows, series and more.

In November 2018, LNK launched a high-definition channel, LNK HD.

Sister channels 
LNK is a part of LNK TV GROUP, the group still consists of 5 TV channels:

BTV
TV1
INFO TV
2TV
LNK.LT (VOD platform)

LNK Group accounts for 28.4% of Lithuania's TV market.

Programming

Lithuanian programs 
Entertainment shows:
Aš matau tavo balsą — local adaptation of I Can See Your Voice
 KK2 and KK2 Penktadienis
 Lietuvos balsas (The Voice of Lithuania)
 Lietuvos balsas. Vaikai. (The Voice of Lithuania. Kids)
Lietuvos balsas. Senjorai. (The Voice of Lithuania. Senior)
Šokio revoliucija
Kaukės (Masked Singer Lithuania)

Lifestyle shows:

 Nuo... iki. 
 Bus visko 

Talk shows:

 Bučiuoju. Rūta 
 VIDO VIDeO

More shows:
 Šeškinės 20 (Comedy Show)
 Gyvūnų Pasaulis (About Animals) 
 Teleloto

News programs:

 LNK žinios
 Labas vakaras, Lietuva
 Vidurdienio Žinios

Lithuanian Series:
 Rimti Reikalai (Action series)
 Monikai Reikia Meilės
 Man Reikia Meilės

Foreign programs

Series 
 Yasak Elma (Turkish series)
 Sen Çal Kapımı (Drama, Love, Comedy, Turkish series)
 Yargı (Drama, Detective, Turkish series)
 Bir Ada Masali (Drama, Comedy, Turkish series)
 Ask Laftan Anlamaz (Drama, Comedy, Turkish series)
 Senden Daha Güzel (Drama, Comedy, Turkish series)
 Dos vidas (Drama, Spanish series)
 Die Rosenheim-Cops (Detective, German series)
 Gadalka (Mystery, Drama, Fantasy, Russian series)

Reality Shows 
 Панянка-селянка / Wieśniaczka (Ukrainian and Polish)
 A farmer wants a wife (Australian)

Animation 
 Oggy and the cockroaches (French animated series)
 Zig and Sharko (French animated series)
 Maya the Bee (German Film)
 Tom and Jerry

See also 
 List of Lithuanian television channels
 Arūnas Valinskas

References

External links 
LNK TV
TV1

Television channels in Lithuania
Television channels and stations established in 1995
1995 establishments in Lithuania